Jader Volnei Spindler, more commonly known as Baré (born 18 January 1982), is a Brazilian footballer who had played for clubs in the Middle East, Japan and China.

Career
In 2001, he was a youth player for Gremio, when he moved to play in Japan as an underage foreigner with Omiya Ardija.

In 2007, he was playing for Gamba Osaka and was selected in the J. League Best XI for the season. In 2008, he played for them in the Pan-Pacific Championship, and scored four goals in the final against Houston Dynamo, in a 6–1 victory for Gamba.

In September 2008 it was being reported that he was set to leave Gamba to play for UAE team Al-Ahli (Dubai), for a transfer fee of 1 billion yen. Baré did subsequently make the move.

Bare won the UAE League title with Al Ahli in 2008/09, before moving to play for Al Jazira for the 2010/11 season.

He moved to Al-Arabi on loan in September 2012, from his parent club Al Jazira of Abu Dhabi.

In 2013 season, he moved back to Japan and signed a contract with Shimizu S-Pulse.

On 24 July 2013, Baré transferred to Chinese Super League side Tianjin Teda.

In February 2016 he joined Glória of Brazil, who play in the Campeonato Gaucho.

Club statistics

References

External links
 Bare:bring on Barcelona - at FIFA

1982 births
Living people
Brazilian footballers
Botafogo Futebol Clube (SP) players
Defensor Sporting players
Montevideo Wanderers F.C. players
Grêmio Foot-Ball Porto Alegrense players
Guarani FC players
Vejle Boldklub players
Omiya Ardija players
Ventforet Kofu players
Gamba Osaka players
Shimizu S-Pulse players
Al Jazira Club players
Al-Arabi SC (Qatar) players
Tianjin Jinmen Tiger F.C. players
Brazilian expatriate footballers
Expatriate footballers in Japan
Expatriate footballers in Uruguay
Expatriate men's footballers in Denmark
Expatriate footballers in the United Arab Emirates
Expatriate footballers in Qatar
Expatriate footballers in China
J1 League players
J2 League players
Danish Superliga players
Qatar Stars League players
Brazilian people of German descent
Al Ahli Club (Dubai) players
Brazilian expatriate sportspeople in China
Chinese Super League players
UAE Pro League players
Association football forwards